The Third Leg of the 2018–19 Curling World Cup took place from January 30 to February 3, 2019 at the Jönköping Curling Club in Jönköping, Sweden. Korea's Kim Min-ji defeated Sweden's Anna Hasselborg in the women's final. Canada's Matt Dunstone defeated Sweden's Niklas Edin in the men's final. Canada's Kadriana Sahaidak and Colton Lott beat Norway's Kristin Skaslien and Thomas Ulsrud for mixed doubles gold.

Format

Curling World Cup matches have eight ends, rather than the standard ten ends. Ties after eight ends will be decided by a shoot-out, with each team throwing a stone and the one closest to the button winning. A win in eight or fewer ends will earn a team 3 points, a shoot-out win 2 points, a shoot-out less 1 point, and 0 points for a loss in eight or fewer ends.

Each event will have eight teams in the men's, women's, and mixed doubles tournament. The teams will be split into two groups of four, based on the Curling World Cup rankings, whereby the 1st, 3rd, 5th, and 7th, ranked teams will be in one group and the 2nd, 4th, 6th, and 8th ranked teams in the other. The first place teams in each group will play against each other in the final. In the event of a tie for first place, a shoot-out will be used, with the same format used to decide matches tied after eight ends.

Qualification

For the first three legs of the Curling World Cup, the eight spots in the tournament are allocated to each of the hosting member associations, the highest ranked member association in each zone (the Americas, European, and Pacific-Asia), and two teams chosen by the World Curling Federation. Member associations may choose to send the same teams to all three legs or have different teams.

The following countries qualified for each discipline:

Women

Teams

Round robin standings

Round robin results

Draw 3

Wednesday, January 30, 20:30

Draw 5

Thursday, January 31, 12:00

Draw 7

Thursday, January 31, 20:00

Draw 9

Friday, February 1, 12:00

Draw 10

Friday, February 1, 16:00

Draw 12

Saturday, February 2, 08:30

Draw 14

Saturday, February 2, 16:00

Draw 15

Saturday, February 2, 20:00

Final
Sunday, February 3, 16:00

Men

Teams

Round robin standings

Round robin results

Draw 2

Wednesday, January 30, 17:30

Draw 4

Thursday, January 31, 08:30

Draw 5

Thursday, January 31, 12:00

Draw 6

Thursday, January 31, 16:00

Draw 8

Friday, February 1, 08:30

Draw 10

Friday, February 1, 16:00

Draw 11

Friday, February 1, 20:00

Draw 12

Saturday, February 2, 08:30

Draw 13

Saturday, February 2, 12:00

Draw 15

Saturday, February 2, 20:00

Final
Sunday, February 3, 12:00

Mixed doubles

Teams

Round robin standings

Round robin results

Draw 1

Wednesday, January 30, 14:30

Draw 4

Thursday, January 31, 08:30

Draw 6

Thursday, January 31, 16:00

Draw 7

Thursday, January 31, 20:00

Draw 8

Friday, February 1, 08:30

Draw 9

Friday, February 1, 12:00

Draw 11

Friday, February 1, 20:00

Draw 13

Saturday, February 2, 12:00

Draw 14

Saturday, February 2, 16:00

Final
Sunday, February 2, 08:30

References

External links

 

Curling World Cup
Curling World Cup – Third Leg
Curling World Cup – Third Leg
International curling competitions hosted by Sweden
Curling World Cup - Third Leg
Curling World Cup - Third Leg
Sports competitions in Jönköping